Basin Street Revue is a 1956 American film directed by Joseph Kohn and Leonard Reed. The film is also known as Basin Street Review (American TV title).

Cast 
Willie Bryant as himself
Sarah Vaughan as herself
Lionel Hampton as himself
Paul Williams as himself
Jimmy Brown as himself
Amos Milburn as himself
Faye Adams as herself
Charles "Honi" Coles as himself
Cholly Atkins as himself
Herb Jeffries as himself
Cab Calloway as himself

Count Basie, The Clovers, Nat "King" Cole, Martha Davis, Frank Foster, Mantan Moreland, Nipsey Russell and Marie Bryant also appear.

External links 

1956 films
American short films
American musical films
American black-and-white films
1956 musical films
1956 short films
1950s English-language films
1950s American films